Lucas Avenue Industrial Historic District is a manufacturing facility bounded by Washington, Delmar, 20th & 21 Streets, St. Louis, Missouri. It was added to the National Register of Historic Places in 2000.  A boundary increase, roughly bounded by Locust St., Delmar, and 19th and 20th Sts. was added in 2007.  Included in the boundary increase are a warehouse, a manufacturing facility and a communications facility.

References

Historic districts on the National Register of Historic Places in Missouri
National Register of Historic Places in St. Louis
Downtown West, St. Louis
2000 establishments in Missouri